Into the Woods is an EP by the Icelandic indie folk/indie pop band Of Monsters and Men, released in the United States on 20 December 2011. Featuring songs from their album My Head Is an Animal, the EP peaked at number 108 on the U.S. Billboard 200.

Track listing

Chart performance

Release history

References

2011 debut EPs
Of Monsters and Men EPs
Republic Records EPs